Brendan "Benny" Coulter is an Irish Gaelic football manager and player who plays for his local club Mayobridge and, previously, for the Down senior football team until his retirement in 2014; he also teaches kids about Gaelic in different schools around Northern Ireland.

Playing career
During his prime, Coulter was regarded as one of the best attackers in Gaelic football. He is Ulster's leading Championship goal scorer of all-time.

He won an Ulster Minor Championship Medal in 1999, and later that year won the All-Ireland Minor Football Championship with Down he scored 1-02 in the All Ireland Final. Down manager Pete McGrath selected Coulter to make his debut for the senior team that year, despite his youth.  He has since become one of Down's key players. He has captained Down, and has been described as the team's 'talisman'.

Coulter was selected to represent Ireland in the International Rules Series five times, in 2003, 2004, 2005, 2006, 2008 and 2010. He has also won 4 Railway Cups he has also won U-12, U-14, U-16, Minor and Reserve League and Championship, and also won an All-Ireland Under-16 Football Championship with St Marks Warrenpoint.

Benny has won 8 county championship with his club Mayobridge and is one of the most iconic players to ever come from the Mourne county.

Coulter has admitted to being targeted by sledging while on the field of play.
Coulter supports Liverpool F.C. Benny was player/manager of Mayobridge GAA in the 2017 and 2018 campaign alongside Francie Poland. He now manages Longstone GAA. One of his controversial goals was against Kildare as Kildare players thought it was a square ball denying them a place in the All - Ireland Final

Managerial career
Coulter was appointed Down minor football team manager ahead of the 2023 season.

Honours
Club
 8 Down Senior Football Championships (1999, 2001, 2002, 2004, 2005, 2006, 2007, 2008)
 6 Down Senior Football League Division 1s (1999, 2001, 2002, 2004, 2009, 2010)

Inter-county
 2 Down Minor Football Championships (1997, 1999)
 1 Ulster Minor Football Championship (1999)
 1 All-Ireland Minor Football Championship (1999)
 1 All Ireland Under 16 Vocational School's (1997)
 1 Ulster Under 16 Vocational School's (1997)
 1 Down Vocational School's (1996)

Provincial
 4 Railway Cups (2003, 2007, 2009, 2012)

International
 3 International Rules (2004, 2008, 2009)

Individual
 2 Down County Final Man of the Matches (2002, 2004)
 1 Ulster final Man of the Match award (2002)
 8 Down club Player of the Year awards (1999, 2000, 2002, 2003, 2004, 2005, 2006, 2007, 2008)
 2 Irish News Ulster All Stars (2003, 2010)
 1 All Star (2010)

References

 

 

1982 births
Living people
All Stars Awards winners (football)
Down inter-county Gaelic footballers
Gaelic football managers
Irish international rules football players
Mayobridge Gaelic footballers
Ulster inter-provincial Gaelic footballers